St Asaph City Football Club is a Welsh football team based in St Asaph, Denbighshire, Wales. They play in the North Wales Coast East Football League Premier Division, which is in the fourth tier of the Welsh football league system.

History
The club played in the inaugural season of the Ardal Leagues but was relegated at the end of the season.

Honours
Welsh Alliance League Division Two – Champions: 2014–15
Vale of Clwyd and Conwy Football League Premier Division – Champions: 2012–13
Clwyd Football League Division Three – Runners-up: 1976–77, 1979–80 (reserves)

References

External links
Club official website

Football clubs in Wales
Welsh Alliance League clubs
Ardal Leagues clubs
Clwyd Football League clubs
North Wales Coast Football League clubs